The 1926 college football season was the first in which an attempt was made to recognize a national champion after the season.

Stanford, coached by Pop Warner, was the top team in the U.S. under the new Dickinson System and was awarded the Rissman Trophy. Unbeaten Stanford (10–0) faced unbeaten Alabama (9–0) in the Rose Bowl, and the two teams played to a 7–7 tie.  Seven years later, Parke H. Davis, a renowned football historian and football rules committee member, declared Lafayette (9–0), where he had previously coached, an "Outstanding Nationwide Team" in Spalding's Official Foot Ball Guide.  Davis' work has been criticized for having a heavy Eastern bias, with little regard for the South and the West Coast.

Conference and program changes

Conference changes
Five new conferences began play in 1926
Buckeye Athletic Association – a conference active through the 1938 season
Pacific Northwest Conference – an active NCAA Division III conference now known as the Northwest Conference
Midwest Athletic Association – a conference of HBCUs active through the 1966 season that was also later known as the Midwest Conference and the Midwestern Conference
Texas Collegiate Athletic Conference – a conference active through the 1955 season
Michigan Collegiate Conference – a conference active through the 1932 season; most members now part of the Mid-American Conference

Membership changes

Program changes
 Kent State Normal College officially changed their nickname from the Silver Foxes to their present moniker, the Golden Flashes.

September
September 18 A few schools opened their seasons early, as Stanford beat Fresno State 44–0.  On September 25 Stanford beat visiting Caltech, 13–0 and USC defeated Whittier 74–0;
Brown beat the University of Rhode Island, 14–0 and Pennsylvania (which had all 9 of its games scheduled at home in Philadelphia) shut out Franklin & Marshall, 41–0.  Lafayette beat Muhlenberg College 35–0
In the South, defending Rose Bowl champion Alabama beat Millsaps College (Jackson, Miss) 54–0.  Tennessee defeated Carson-Newman, 13–0.

October
October 2  Navy opened its season with a 17–13 win over Purdue, while Army started with a 21–0 win over Mercy College of Detroit.  Brown beat Colby College (of Maine), 35–0 and Pennsylvania beat Johns Hopkins, 40–7.  Lafayette won again, beating Schuylkill (which later was merged with Albright College) 47–0;

Stanford defeated Occidental 19–0 and USC defeated Santa Clara 42–0.

Alabama played Vanderbilt at Nashville and won 19–7; Tennessee beat North Carolina, 34–0.

Ohio State opened its season with a 40–0 win over Wittenberg University, while Michigan started with a 42–3 win over visiting Oklahoma State.  Northwestern opened its season with a 34–0 win over visiting South Dakota.  Notre Dame tuned up with a game against Wisconsin's Beloit College, winning  77–0.  In the Missouri Valley, Kansas State beat Texas, 13–3.

October 9 At Annapolis, Navy's football team played a doubleheader, albeit with two different squads.  The varsity beat a weak Drake University team, 24–7, and the reserves beat Richmond, 26–0.  Army defeated West Virginia's Davis & Elkins College, 21–7.  Lafayette beat Pittsburgh, 17–7 and Pennsylvania beat Swarthmore, 44–0.

Ohio State played Ohio Wesleyan and won 47–0 and Northwestern beat Minnesota's Carleton College, 31–3.  Michigan crushed Michigan State, 55–3, in a conference game.
Notre Dame won at Minnesota, 19–7

Stanford had a 7–3 victory over an amateur team, the Olympic Club (from San Francisco).  USC defeated a strong Washington State team, 16–7

Alabama beat Mississippi State 26–7 at a game in Meridian, Mississippi, while Tennessee won at LSU, 14–7.  Kansas State won at Creighton 12–0.

October 16 In New York, Columbia University hosted Ohio State in an intersectional game, and lost, 32–7.
Brown defeated Bates College 27–14 in Providence, while in Philadelphia, Pennsylvania hosted Chicago and won 27–0.  Navy won at Princeton 27–13, while Army played a strong Syracuse team and won 27–21.   Lafayette beat Dickinson 30–7.
 
Stanford defeated Nevada 33–0, and USC beat Occidental, 28–6

At Atlanta, Alabama beat Georgia Tech 21–0.  Tennessee had beaten Maryville the day before, 6–0.  Notre Dame beat visiting Penn State, 28–0. In Western Conference play, Michigan beat Minnesota, 20–0, Northwestern defeated Indiana 20–0, and Illinois beat Iowa 13–6.  Kansas State defeated Kansas, 27–0.

October 23 Brown played its first Ivy opponent, winning 7–0 at Yale.  Pennsylvania beat Williams College, 36–0.  Navy beat Colgate, 13–7, and Army beat Boston University 41–0.  Lafayette defeated Albany, 30–7.

Notre Dame won at Northwestern, handing the Wildcats their first defeat, 6–0, with Rockne's reserves scoring on a touchdown pass.  Alabama had a 2–0 win over Sewanee; Tennessee beat Centre College, 30–7.  In Pacific Coast Conference games, Stanford won 29–12 at Oregon, and USC beat California at Berkeley, 27–0.  In Western Conference play,  Ohio State beat Iowa 23–6 and Michigan beat Illinois 13–0.Kansas State went to 5–0–0, winning at Oklahoma, 15–12.

October 30 Navy (5–0–0) and Michigan (4–0–0) played in Baltimore in an intersectional match of unbeatens.  Though the Wolverines were heavily favored, Navy blocked a field goal and held Michigan 2 yards from goal in the first half; Hamilton of Navy kicked a field goal, made a key interception to set up a touchdown, and added the point after for a 10–0 win.

In Los Angeles, another big game between unbeatens matched Stanford and Southern California (USC), both 5–0–0, faced off.  USC scored first, but Dick Hyland blocked the extra point; after a second Trojan touchdown, the kick failed, and USC had a 12–0 lead.  Stanford scored, but the extra point kick hit the upright, and it was 12–6 at halftime. Biff Hoffman's pass to Dick Hyland tied the game for Stanford, and George Bogue's point after kick proved to be the winning margin in Stanford's 13–12 win.  Lafayette and Washington & Jefferson were both 5–0–0 when they met in Philadelphia; the Presidents lost to Lafayette, 16–10

At Champaign, Illinois (4–1–0) hosted unbeaten (5–0–0) Pennsylvania, and won 3–0, while at Atlanta, Notre Dame beat Georgia Tech 12–0.  Alabama defeated LSU, 24–0 and Tennessee won at Mississippi State, 33–0.  Army won at Yale, 33–0 and Brown won at Dartmouth, 10–0.  Ohio State won at the University of Chicago, 18–0., and Northwestern won its rematch with the Hoosiers at Indiana, 21–0.
Kansas State went to 5–0–0 in beating Arkansas, 16–7.

November
November 6  
Navy played an easy opponent in West Virginia Wesleyan College, winning 53–7.  Army won its sixth straight, a 55–0 whitewash of Franklin & Marshall.  Lafayette won again, beating Rutgers 37–0; Brown beat Norwich College, 27–0 and Pennsylvania beat Penn State, 3–0.

Alabama beat Kentucky 14–0 and Tennessee beat Sewanee 12–0.  Stanford beat Santa Clara 33–14, while USC was idle.  Michigan beat Wisconsin, 37–0, Northwestern beat Purdue 22–0, and Illinois won at Chicago 7–0.  Ohio State defeated Wilmington, 13–7.  Notre Dame won at Indiana, 26–0.  In Milwaukee, Kansas State suffered its first defeat, losing to Marquette, 14–0.

On Armistice Day (November 11, USC (5–1–0) and Oregon State (4–0–0) played at Portland, Oregon.  USC won 17–7.

November 13 In Yankee Stadium, Notre Dame and Army, both 6–0–0, faced off in another battle of powerhouses.  The Fighting Irish handed the Cadets their first defeat, 7–0.  In Columbus, Ohio State (6–0–0) hosted conference rival Michigan (5–1–0).  The visitors won by a point, 17–16.  
Tennessee (7–0) and Vanderbilt (6–1) faced off in Nashville, and the Vols suffered their first defeat, 20–3.  Stanford (8–0–0) hosted Washington State (7–1–0) in another big PCC game, and won, 29–10.

Northwestern, meanwhile, beat Chicago 38–7.  Illinois defeated Wabash 27–13
Navy defeated Georgetown University, 10–7, and Lafayette recorded a fourth shutout, over Susquehanna, 68–0;  Alabama beat Florida, 49–0;  Kansas State lost again, at Nebraska, 3–0.  Brown won at Harvard, 21–0 and Pennsylvania beat Columbia 3–0.

November 20  Navy played Loyola College of Baltimore, winning 35–13, and Army beat  Ursinus, 21–15.  Lafayette completed its season with a 35–0 win in its annual game against Lehigh
Brown defeated New Hampshire, 40–12, to extend its record to 9–0–0.

Ohio State closed its season with a 7–6 win at Illinois, while Michigan recorded the same score in a rematch against the Gophers at Minnesota.  Northwestern defeated Iowa, 13–6.  All three schools finished 7–1–0, with Michigan and Northwestern being 5–0 in Western Conference play.

Notre Dame beat Drake, 21–0.  Kansas State, after winning its first five, lost its next three, including a 3–2 defeat by visiting Iowa State; the Wildcats' final record was 5–3–0.  USC defeated Idaho, 38–6.  Stanford closed the regular season with its traditional finale against California.  Though the Golden Bears had the home field, they were also having their first losing season since 1916, when their program began.  California lost, 41–6.

On Thanksgiving Day, November 25, Alabama hosted Georgia winning 33–6, and USC crushed Montana, 61–0.  Pennsylvania closed its season with a 10–10 tie with Cornell.

On November 27, Notre Dame was shocked by Carnegie Tech, 19–0.  The 1926 Army-Navy game took place in Chicago.  Navy, at 9–0–0, was unbeaten, while Army (7–1–0) had a single loss, to Notre Dame.  The two teams played to a 21–21 tie.  In Providence, Brown and Colgate tied, 10–10.

December 4 In Los Angeles, Notre Dame closed its season with a 13–12 win over USC.

At season's end, there were two "unbeaten and untied" teams, the Indians (later, "the Cardinal") of Leland Stanford University, and the Crimson Tide of the University of Alabama.  Alabama, which had won the Rose Bowl the previous year, was invited to return to Pasadena to face Stanford's PCC champion team.

Rose Bowl

United Press called the 1927 Rose Bowl "the football championship of America", and the game was considered the most exciting in the series up to that time. The crowd of 68,000 set an attendance record. Stanford's George Bogue missed an 18-yard field goal attempt in the first quarter, then threw a touchdown pass to Ed Walker and kicked the point after to put Stanford up, 7–0. Stanford held that lead through most of the rest of the game, but in the final minutes, they were forced to punt on fourth down. Frankie Wilton's kick was blocked, and Alabama took over 14 yards from goal. Four plays later, and with a minute left, Jimmy Johnson carried the ball for a touchdown, making it 7–6. The two-point conversion, and overtime, were decades in the future. Stanford's only hope was to block the point after, but Alabama ran the play quickly and Herschel Caldwell's kick tied Stanford, and took away a Stanford victory in the final minute.

Conference standings

Major conference standings

Independents

Minor conferences

Minor conference standings

Dickinson System
The AP sportswriters' poll would not begin continuously until 1936. (although, the first time was a one instance publishing in 1934)  Frank G. Dickinson, an economics professor at the University of Illinois, had invented the Dickinson System to rank colleges based upon their records and the strength of their opposition.  The system was originally designed to rank teams in the Big Nine (later the Big Ten) conference.  Chicago clothing manufacturer Jack Rissman then persuaded Dickinson to rank the nation's teams under the system, and awarded the Rissman Trophy to the winning university.

Although Dickinson retroactively applied the system to the 1924 and 1925 seasons, the year 1926 was the first in which the trophy was awarded at season's end.  The system awarded 30 points for a win over a "strong team", and 20 for a win over a "weak team".  Losses were awarded points (15 for loss to a strong team, 10 for loss to a weak team).  Ties were treated as half a win and half a loss (22.5 for a tie with a strong team, 15 for a tie with a weak team).  An average was then derived by dividing the points by games played.

Final Dickinson rankings
Professor Dickinson's rating metrics were unfavorable to Alabama, which won all nine of its regular season games, but were given an average rating of 16.67, less than the average for wins over weak (20.00 point) contenders. Alabama was the only Southern team in the 1926 rankings.

Awards and honors

All-Americans

The consensus All-America team included:

Statistical leaders
Team scoring most points: Haskell, 558
Player scoring most points: Fred Koster, Louisville, 124, or Mayes McClain, Haskell, 253
Total offense leader: Gibby Welch, Pitt

References